The Game of Life: Twists & Turns is a 2007 version of the classic board game The Game of Life. Players try to earn the most life points in this game by going through various paths. A major change in this game from the original is that players use an electronic Lifepod instead of money to play the game.

Setup/Starting

To set up the game, players each get a Visa Game Card, a matching coloured scorecard, a skateboard and car upgrades. All players also get some arrow clips and a Lifepod Reference card.
The Career cards are divided among the players, and one is chosen. Players then put an arrow clip on the lowest step of their career ($5,000). The Life Cards are then shuffled, and players put their skateboards on any of the start spaces- Earn It!, Learn It!, Live It! or Love it!.

Years for playing
Players must enter the number of "years" they want to play into the Lifepod when they start the game. This can be any number from 1 to 99 and can be shortened/lengthened if desired. It is recommended that players play at least 10 years on their very first time playing.

A 4 player game will take approximately 40 minutes for 10 years, 1 hour for 15 years and 2 hours for 30 years. A game with fewer players will take less time.

Gameplay
On a player's turn, they press SPIN on the Lifepod. It will automatically give the other player salary for their job. A red light will travel around the numbers before finally stopping on a number. This is the number of spaces a player moves. If a player wants to, they can move directly to any Start space instead of moving. This ends their turn.

The player must then resolve the space they landed/stopped/passed on (see Game Spaces below).

Contents
The game includes the following:
Electronic Lifepod- The Lifepod is where players enter the amounts and keep track of all their assets in the game.
Visa Game Cards- Inserted into Lifepod at start of turn, taken out at the end. Comes in 4 colours (red, blue, green, yellow).
Gameboard- Divided into 4 parts
Scorecards- Used for tracking marriage, babies, salaries, degrees and houses.
Career Cards- All career cards have 7 careers (see Careers below).
Lifepod Reference Cards- Used to help players press the right buttons on the Lifepod.
Arrow Clips-Attached to scorecards.
Skateboards & Car Upgrades- Used to represent the player's vehicle used to travel around the board with. Each has its own bonus.
Life Cards- Have events on them that tell players to add/take away money and Life Points. They are decided by what section of the board the player is on.
Quick Rules Card/Instructions- Quick Rules Card helps players get into the game faster while the instructions give players more details on what to do in the game.

Game Spaces
The game spaces and what to do if a player lands on them:

Blank & Start Spaces- The player draws a Life Card.
Car/House Spaces- The player may choose to buy/sell a car/house. The player draws a Life Card if he/she doesn't want to buy/sell a car/house.
Lottery- Play Lottery ( The player who landed on Lottery picks 3 numbers, other players pick 1. The player whose number comes up wins the Lottery amount). The player draws Life Card if he/she doesn't want to play.

Earn It! Spaces
+1 Promotion- The player moves his/her arrow clip one step up their career ladder (they must meet requirements). If their career has a ?-Chance, they press Chance on the Lifepod. 1 or 2 gets the promotion, while a 0 leaves the salary where it is.
+2 Promotions- Similar to +1 Promotion, but the player moves arrow clip two steps up career ladder (they must meet requirements). If their career has ?-Chance, the player has two chances to spin a 1 or 2 and get the two promotions.
Business Venture- The player takes away $10,000 to $100,000 from their account, and presses Chance. A 1 or 2 adds twice the amount taken away, while a 0 loses the investment. The player draw Life Card if he/she doesn't want to invest.

Learn It! Spaces
Pay Space- The player pays the amount indicated on the space.
Earn Degree- The player adds 2,000 Life Points and adds an arrow clip to the degree on the scorecard.
May Choose a New Career- If a player wants to, they may pick another Career card to replace theirs. They will start on the same space (as long as requirements are met).
Earn PH.D- A player stops on this space, adds 3,000 Life Points, gets a promotion and adds an arrow clip to the PH.D on the scorecard.

Live It! Spaces
Pay Travel Expenses- The player stops and pays $20,000.
+ Life Points- The player adds the Life Points indicated.
Auction- The player may choose to take away $10,000 to $100,000 from their account, and press Chance. A 1 or 2 adds twice the amount taken away, while a 0 loses the auction. A player draws a Life Card if he/she don't want to bid in auction.

Love It! Spaces
Get Married- The player stops, presses Marriage (3) on the Lifepod and presses Enter. All other players automatically give the married player $1,000. That player now gets 3,000 Life Points now and 1,500 every turn from then on. If the player is already married, follow the same instructions. That player will get extra Life Points
Try for a Baby- The player stops, and presses Chance. A 0 means no babies, 1 means a baby and two means twins. The player is given 350 Life Points for each baby, but subtracts 10%–40% from the player's salary.
Baby Boy or Baby Girl- The player adds a baby. For Twins the player adds two babies.

LIFEPod Buttons/Functions

The buttons and their functions follow. Note that 4 and 9 are not used for anything except when entering money, Life Points and salaries

Winning the game
The game is over when the Lifepod runs out of years. Each player puts their Visa Card into the Lifepod, which will calculate the number of Life Points the player has won. This is done by changing the values of their cars and houses into Life Points. The player with the most Life Points wins the game.

Differences

Careers
There are 24 Career Cards in The Game of Life: Twists and Turns (12 double-sided cards). The careers you can choose from in The Game of Life: Twists and Turns and their salaries are:

Board games introduced in 2007